Sinum minus is a species of predatory sea snail, a marine gastropod mollusc in the family Naticidae, the moon snails.

Distribution
This species occurs in the Gulf of Mexico.

Description 
The maximum recorded shell length is 13 mm.

Habitat 
Minimum recorded depth is 64 m. Maximum recorded depth is 154 m.

References

 Rosenberg, G., F. Moretzsohn, and E. F. García. 2009. Gastropoda (Mollusca) of the Gulf of Mexico, Pp. 579–699 in Felder, D.L. and D.K. Camp (eds.), Gulf of Mexico–Origins, Waters, and Biota. Biodiversity. Texas A&M Press, College Station, Texas.
 Torigoe K. & Inaba A. (2011) Revision on the classification of Recent Naticidae. Bulletin of the Nishinomiya Shell Museum 7: 133 + 15 pp., 4 pls.

External links
 

Naticidae
Gastropods described in 1889